Farmers' Bulletin was published by the United States Department of Agriculture with the first issue appearing in June 1889. The farm bulletins could be obtained upon the written request to a Member of Congress or to the United States Secretary of Agriculture. The agricultural circular would be sent complimentary to any address within the United States. The agricultural publication covered an extensive range of rural topics as related to agricultural science, agronomy, plant diseases, rural living, soil conservation, and sustainable agriculture.

Predecessor of Farmers' Bulletin
The Department of Agriculture was established upon the passage of H.R. 269 bill as enacted into law by Abraham Lincoln on May 15, 1862. In accordance with section three of the federal statute, the agriculture agency acquired the United States Patent office chemistry bureau. The Division of Chemistry was authorized as a federal supplemental organization of the Department of Agriculture upon the enactment of the United States agricultural H.R. 269 legislation.

The Department of Agriculture Chemistry Division authored an agricultural bulletin first appearing in 1883. The agricultural chemistry publication sustained three decades of print production before being discontinued in 1913.

See also

References

Reading Bibliography

External links
 
 
 
 
 
 
 
 
 
 

Agricultural magazines